Embodiment: Collapsing Under the Weight of God is the third studio album by the band Sculptured. The cover artwork is designed by John Haughm; he used images borrowed with permission from the National Library of Medicine. Haughm also designed the layout for the booklet using similar imagery and the photography of Veleda Thorsson. The album also contains samples of speech from the 1981 film Possession in "Taking My Body Apart", and from the 2000 short film Camera in "Embodiment is the Purest Form of Horror".

Track listing

 "Taking My Body Apart" – 8:31
 "The Shape of Rage" – 6:04
 "A Moment of Uncertainty" – 6:31
 "Bodies Without Organs" – 7:37
 "Embodiment is the Purest Form of Horror" – 10:36

Personnel

Don Anderson - guitars, vocals
Jason William Walton - bass
Andy Winter - keyboards
David Murray - drums
Thomas Walling - lead vocals

References

External links
Embodiment: Collapsing Under the Weight of God @ Encyclopaedia Metallum
SCULPTURED Embodiment music reviews and MP3 @ progarchives.com

2008 albums
Sculptured albums
The End Records albums